Iraota distanti, the Distant's silverstreak, is  a species of lycaenid or blue butterfly with at least two subspecies found in Peninsular Thailand, Malaya, Singapore, Sumatra, Mentawi and Borneo.

Gallery

External links
 Shows a photo of female I. distanti from Singapore

Cited references

Amblypodiini
Butterflies of Borneo
Butterflies described in 1889